William H. Davis was an American politician.

He served in the Pennsylvania House of Representatives in 1854, as a Democrat from Crawford County.

References

Year of birth missing
People from Crawford County, Pennsylvania
Democratic Party members of the Pennsylvania House of Representatives
19th-century American politicians
Year of death missing